Proposition 125 (also known as the Wine Sales in Grocery and Convenience Stores Initiative) is a citizen-initiated, statewide ballot measure that was approved in Colorado on November 8th, 2022. If passed, the measure would allow grocery and convenience stores that sell beer to also sell wine.

Overview
Proposition 125 would:
create a new fermented malt beverage and wine retailer license 
automatically convert old fermented malt beverage (FMB) licenses to the new fermented malt beverage and wine license, effective March 1, 2023
allow grocery stores, convenience stores, and other businesses that are licensed to sell beer to also sell wine 
allow the same stores to offer tastings, if approved by the local licensing authority

Additionally, a new license could not be issued to a location within 500 feet of an existing retail liquor store and a new retail liquor store license could not be issued to a location within 500 feet of an existing licensed fermented malt beverage and wine retailer.

Background
Under current Colorado law, the vast majority of grocery stores are only licensed to sell alcohol in the form of beer and other fermented malt beverages (hard seltzer, hard lemonade, etc), while retail liquor stores are licensed to sell every type of alcohol.

Support
Proposition 125 is supported by the Colorado Chamber of Commerce, The Denver Post, the Rocky Mountain State Conference of the NAACP, and the Wine in Grocery Stores Initiative.

Opposition
Proposition 125 is opposed by the Colorado Licensed Beverage Association and the Keeping Colorado Local Campaign.

References

Colorado ballot measures
2022 Colorado elections